Patricia Deutsch Ross (born Elaine Patricia Deutsch; December 16, 1943 – July 26, 2017) was an American actress and comedian who was well known as a recurring panelist on the 1970s game shows Match Game and Tattletales.

Early life
Deutsch was born in Pittsburgh, Pennsylvania. She graduated from Taylor Allderdice High School in 1961. She then attended Bennington College, Carnegie Mellon, the University of Texas at Austin, and the University of Southern California within a four-year period.

Career

Stage
Early in her career, Deutsch starred in local productions of Neil Simon's California Suite at La Mirada and Long Beach. She also worked alongside Sid Caesar "as his new Imogene Coca" at the Rainbow Grill in New York City.

Improv
In the 1960s and early 1970s, Deutsch was a member of Ace Trucking Company, an improvisational comedy group whose members also included Bill Saluga, Fred Willard, George Memmoli, and Michael Mislove. Ace Trucking Company performed regularly on This Is Tom Jones and The Tonight Show with Johnny Carson, and also recorded a sketch album with RCA. She has stated she was the original “Truckette”.

Television
From 1972 to 1973, Deutsch was a regular cast member on the final season of Rowan & Martin's Laugh-In, where she worked with her future fellow Match Game panelist Richard Dawson.

From 1973 to 1979, Deutsch was a recurring celebrity panelist on Match Game, and became a popular fixture in the number six seat. She also occasionally appeared on  Tattletales with her husband.

In 1978, Deutsch appeared in the short-lived television series Grandpa Goes to Washington.

During the 1980s, she continued to guest-star on episodes of series such as Moonlighting and She's the Sheriff.

Her final television credit was a guest role as an old lady in the ABC series Don't Trust the B---- in Apartment 23.

Guest appearances
In addition to The Tonight Show with Johnny Carson, Deutsch also had guest appearances on The Merv Griffin Show, The Dick Cavett Show and The Steve Allen Show.

On March 7, 2008, she appeared as a guest on GSN's interstitial program GSN Live.

In 2009, Deutsch, along with Match Game co-panelists Joyce Bulifant and Nancy Dussault, attended the GSN Game Show Awards to accept the "Favorite Classic Game Show" award on behalf of Match Game. During their acceptance speeches, Deutsch, Bulifant and Dussault fondly remembered their friends, host Gene Rayburn and fellow panelist Charles Nelson Reilly.

Voice acting
During the early years of the show The Electric Company, Deutsch did voice-over work for some of the vignette cartoons with actor and show writer Paul Dooley.

In the 1980s and 1990s, Deutsch did regular voice work for Hanna Barbera in both The Smurfs and Capitol Critters cartoon series. She provided the voice for Mrs. Dave, the mother of Dr. Dave, on the popular Nickelodeon cartoon As Told by Ginger. She also had occasional voice roles in other popular cartoon series, such as Darkwing Duck.

Her later work included movie voice-overs for Tarzan, The Emperor's New Groove, Monsters, Inc. and Happily N'Ever After.

Commercials
Over the course of her career, Deutsch appeared in hundreds of local and national commercials, including classic spots for Folgers coffee and Charmin bathroom tissue. She also did commercials for M&M Meat Shops, a Canadian food retailer.

Movies
She made a cameo appearance in the 1983 movie Mr. Mom, playing The Deli Girl.

Personal life
During her improv years, Deutsch met her future husband, comedy screenwriter and playwright Donald Ross. They married in 1968 and had three children: Max Ross, Lee Sachnoff and Alexis Hill.  Both Deutsch and Ross appeared the same week as guests on Match Game '74.

Deutsch died of cancer on July 26, 2017, at age 73, at home in Los Angeles. Her husband also had cancer, and died on June 1, 2018.

Selected filmography

Film
Dynamite Chicken (1971) – herself, with The Ace Trucking Company
Mr. Mom (1983) – Deli Girl
Jetsons: The Movie (1990) – Lucy-2 (voice)
Tarzan (1999) – Tantor's Mother (voice)
The Land Before Time VII: The Stone of Cold Fire (2000) – Rainbow Face #2 (voice)
The Emperor's New Groove (2000) – Waitress (voice)
Monsters, Inc. (2001) – Photo Couple #1 (voice)
Kronk's New Groove (2005) – Waitress (voice)
Happily N'Ever After (2006) – (voice)
Immigrants (2008) - Greta Knight (English version, voice)

Television
This Is Tom Jones (1969-1971) – regular performer with The Ace Trucking Company
Rowan and Martin's Laugh-In (1972–1973) – regular performer
Match Game (1973–1979) – frequent panelist
Tattletales (1974–1978, 1982–1984) – frequent panelist
Grandpa Goes to Washington  (1978–1979) – Patti
Capitol Critters (1992) – Trixie
The Wild Thornberrys (1999) - Clan Hyena (voice)
As Told by Ginger (2000) - Mrs. Dave (voice)
The Berenstain Bears (2003–2004) – additional voices
The 100 Most Unexpected TV Moments (2005) – herself
The Emperor's New School (2007-2008) – Mata, the Lunch Lady
Don't Trust the B---- in Apartment 23 (2013) - Old lady

References

External links
 
 

 https://www.findagrave.com/memorial/181850209/patti-deutsch

1943 births
2017 deaths
Actresses from Pittsburgh
American television personalities
American voice actresses
Deaths from cancer in California
20th-century American actresses
21st-century American actresses
American film actresses
American television actresses